Harry William Leonard (born 28 April 1992) is a Scottish professional rugby union player.

International career
Leonard impressed in the first half of his debut season before refocusing on the 2012 Under-20 6 Nations championship. He was named as captain of the Under-20 Squad for the Junior World Championships in South Africa. He has represented Scotland at under-18 level and Scotland under-20, 2011 under-20 6 Nations.

Club career
Leonard joined Edinburgh as an elite development player in the summer of 2011 shortly before travelling to New Zealand as one of the 3 players selected for the McPhail Scholarship. Despite still being eligible for under-20 rugby, Leonard showed clear composure from stand-off in the RaboDirect Pro 12 and Heineken cup.

For the 2013–14 season, Leonard was drafted to Melrose and played a key role in their win over defending club champions Ayr. He kicked a conversion and a penalty in the important early season game played in Ayr.

On 2 April 2014, Leonard signed a contract to join Yorkshire Carnegie who compete in the RFU Championship from the 2014–15 season.

After two seasons with Yorkshire Carnegie, and despite a decent scoring record for the side, Harry signed for ambitious Rosslyn Park playing in National League 1.  His debut season with Rosslyn Park was very successful for Harry on a personal note as he finished as the divisions top scorer for 2016-17 with 265 points.

Rugby union season-by-season playing stats

Club

International/Representative

Honours & records 

Rosslyn Park
National League 1 top points scorer: 2016-17 (265 points)

Notes

References

External links
 ESPN profile
Statbunker profile

1992 births
Living people
Rugby union players from Brighton
Scottish rugby union players
Edinburgh Rugby players
Rugby union centres